The Pensions Act 2008 (c 30) is an Act of the Parliament of the United Kingdom. The principal change brought about by the Act is that all workers will have to opt out of an occupational pension plan of their employer, rather than opt in. A second change is the creation of a National Employment Savings Trust, a public pension provider for those who do not have an occupational pensions, which will function as a low-fee pension scheme in competition with existing funds.

Contents
The Pensions Bill 2011 working its way through Parliament makes a number of amendments to the Act, ahead of its due date to be brought into force in 2012.

See also
Minimum employer contribution
Pensions in the United Kingdom
National Employment Savings Trust
Pensions in the United States
Pension Protection Act of 2006, a law allowing (but not requiring) employers to automatically enrol employees into defined contribution schemes

State pensions Acts
National Insurance Act 1946
Social Security Contributions and Benefits Act 1992

Private pensions Acts
Pension Schemes Act 1993
Pensions Act 1995
Pensions Act 2004
Pensions Act 2007

Notes

References
'All firms must offer pensions, government agrees' (27 October 2010) BBC News
E McGaughey, A Casebook on Labour Law (Hart 2019) ch 6(4)

External links
Department of Work and Pensions explanatory page
The Pensions Act 2008, as amended from the National Archives.
The Pensions Act 2008, as originally enacted from the National Archives.
Explanatory notes to the Pensions Act 2008.

Pensions in the United Kingdom
United Kingdom Acts of Parliament 2008